Arthur W. Moore House, also known as Rockhaven, is a historic home located near Horse Shoe, Henderson County, North Carolina. It was built in 1936, and is a one-story, "U"-shaped masonry dwelling with American Craftsman style design elements.  It rests on a stone and brick foundation, a river rock exterior, and has a tile roof.  Also on the property is the contributing original rock garden landscape (1936) and storage shed (c. 1942). It was built as the summer residence for Arthur W. Moore.

It was listed on the National Register of Historic Places in 2001.

References

Houses on the National Register of Historic Places in North Carolina
Houses completed in 1936
Houses in Henderson County, North Carolina
National Register of Historic Places in Henderson County, North Carolina
1936 establishments in North Carolina